Vaparala is a census town in Cuddapah district in the Indian state of Andhra Pradesh.

Demographics
 India census, Veparala had a population of 6,602. Males constitute 49% of the population and females 51%. Vaparala has an average literacy rate of 59%, lower than the national average of 59.5%: male literacy is 74%, and female literacy is 44%. In Vaparala, 10% of the population is under 6 years of age.

References

Villages in Kadapa district